Rod Whitaker may refer to:

 Trevanian (Rodney William Whitaker, 1931–2005), American film scholar and writer 
 Rod Whitaker (rugby league) (born 1963), rugby league footballer
 Rodney Whitaker (born 1968), American jazz double bass player and educator